Byland Abbey is a ruined abbey and a small village in the Ryedale district of North Yorkshire, England, in the North York Moors National Park.

History
It was founded as a Savigniac abbey in January 1135 and was absorbed by the Cistercian order in 1147. It was not an easy start for the community which had had to move five times before settling at New Byland, near Coxwold in 1177.

Its early history was marked by disputes with no fewer than four other religious establishments: Furness Abbey, Calder Abbey, Rievaulx Abbey and Newburgh Priory. However, once it had overcome these setbacks, it was described, in the late 14th century, as "one of the three shining lights of the north". Its financial success was not as great as such abbeys as Rievaulx, but it was famed for its sheep rearing and wool exports. Its church was said to be among the finest 12th-century churches in Europe.

In October 1322, King Edward II was at Byland Abbey when the Battle of Old Byland took place. The marauding Scots caught Edward so unaware that he fled to York, leaving many precious items behind.

In the late 12th century the abbey had a complement of 36 monks and 100 lay brothers, but by the time of the dissolution in November 1538, the abbey was host only to 25 monks and an abbot. In 1539, its site was granted to Sir William Pickering.

The site is now maintained by English Heritage and is scheduled as an ancient monument by Historic England with grade I listed status. In October 2017, the west frontage of the church, including the famed Rose Window, underwent extensive conservation work to repair water damage and to repoint the stone walls.

Burials 

Mabel de Clare, d. 1204 (daughter of Roger de Clare, 2nd Earl of Hertford), wife of Nigel de Mowbray
Roger de Mowbray (Lord of Montbray) (though some uncertainty about his final resting place)
William de Mowbray, 6th Baron of Thirsk, 4th Baron Mowbray
Joan of Lancaster, third daughter of Henry, 3rd Earl of Lancaster

Medieval ghost stories 
Numerous Latin manuscripts were produced at and owned by Byland Abbey, of which twenty-seven are known to have survived. The abbey notably produced a 15th century cartulary, now British Library Egerton MS 2823. One of the manuscripts owned by Byland Abbey in the Middle Ages is noted for containing a collection of twelve ghost stories. The manuscript is now London, British Library Royal MS 15 A xx, produced in the twelfth to thirteenth centuries, primarily containing a copy of the Elucidarium and some tracts by Cicero. However, in the early fifteenth century, an anonymous scribe, known in scholarship simply as 'a monk of Byland', added some extra texts, also in Latin, on previously blank pages (folios 140-43, in the body of the manuscript, and folio 163 b at the end). These are a series of twelve ghost stories, mostly set locally, which were presumably intended for inclusion in sermons as exempla and which reflect orally circulating folklore in Yorkshire at the time. While not a major literary production in their own time, these stories have since come to be regarded as important evidence for popular belief regarding ghosts in medieval north-west Europe.

A facsimile of the manuscript is available online, the texts were edited by M. R. James, and they were translated by A. J. Grant (while seven are also paraphrased in English by Andrew Joynes).

An example, the third story, runs in English translation as follows:

III. Regarding the spirit of Robert son of Robert de Boltebi from Killeburne, confined in a cemetery.

Remembered because the aforesaid younger Robert died and was interred in a cemetery but was wont to depart from the tomb at night and to disturb and frighten off the villagers, and the dogs of the village would follow him and bark loudly. At last the young men of the village spoke together, proposing to capture him if by any means they were able, and convening at the cemetery. But having seen him, all fled except two of them. One, called Robert Foxton, caught him as he emerged from the cemetery and laid him over the church gate, loudly and courageously shouting "You hold fast until I come to you". The other replied, "You dash quickly to the minister so that he may be conjured, since, God willing, because I have him fast, I will hang on until the arrival of the priest". The priest of the parish indeed hurried quickly and conjured him the holy name of the Trinity and by the virtue of Jesus Christ until he responded to his questions.

At that conjuration, he spoke in his guts (and not with his tongue, but as if in a large empty jar) and confessed his many crimes. When he knew these, the priest absolved him but he insisted that the aforesaid capturers would not reveal in any way his confession, and otherwise he rested in peace, having been set in order with God.

Description
Impressive remains can still be seen, in the care of English Heritage, including the lower half of a huge rose window which was the inspiration for the same window at York Minster.  An interesting feature is the preservation of some of the brightly coloured medieval floor tiles. An altar table (mensa) was also recovered, although that is now in Ampleforth Abbey, and a stone lectern base from the chapter house is the only example of its kind in Britain. In 2017, conservation work was undertaken to preserve the remains.

Gallery

See also
Battle of Old Byland
Wimund - English bishop, later turned pirate, was held here after his capture in the 12th century.

Notes

References

External links

Byland Abbey website history, building and lands.
Official page: English Heritage
Finding aid to Byland Abbey manuscripts at Columbia University. Rare Book & Manuscript Library.

1135 establishments in England
Religious organizations established in the 1130s
1539 disestablishments in England
Cistercian monasteries in England
English Heritage sites in North Yorkshire
Ruins in North Yorkshire
Monasteries in North Yorkshire
Churches in North Yorkshire
Christian monasteries established in the 12th century
Monasteries dissolved under the English Reformation